The Southern League is an amateur status league competition run by FootballSouth and Mainland Football for Association football clubs located in the South Island of New Zealand. It is at the second level of New Zealand Football behind the national association based New Zealand National League, and the highest level of club based football available to teams within the region.

Renaming and restructuring of leagues in the country 
In March 2021, New Zealand Football announced a change to the structure of both the premiership and the top regional leagues around the country. The four top regional leagues (NRFL Premier, Central Premier League, Mainland Premier League and the FootballSouth Premier League) would be formed into the Northern League, Central League, and the Southern League. These leagues would allow local clubs to qualify for the premiership season (now known as the National League Championship), with the top 4 teams from the Northern League, the top 3 teams from the Central League, and the top 2 teams from the Southern League making up the competition, alongside the Wellington Phoenix Reserve side. All teams that qualify plus the Phoenix Reserves, would then play a single round-robin competition between September and December. For the Southern League, the two existing competitions run in the South Island (Mainland Premier League and FootballSouth Premier League) play their original league seasons for the teams to then qualify for a place in the newly formed competition. Five teams from Mainland Premiership, which covers the top of the South Island to Christchurch and three teams from FootballSouth Premier League, covering from below Christchurch to the bottom of the South Island, will qualify. The competition will start on the 17 July 2021.

Current clubs

As of 2022 season

Top scorers
The following list is from the 2021 season onwards after New Zealand Football changed the football league system in New Zealand. From 2021, the Southern League has acted as a qualifier league to the National League.

Records
The following records are from the 2021 season onwards after New Zealand Football changed the football league system in New Zealand. From 2021, the Southern League has acted as a qualifier league to the National League. The records are up to date as of the end of the 2022 season.
 Most wins in a season: 16 – Cashmere Technical and Christchurch United (2022)
 Fewest defeats in a season: 1 – Cashmere Technical (2021); Cashmere Technical and Christchurch United (2022)
 Most goals scored in a season: 79 – Cashmere Technical (2022)
 Fewest goals conceded in a season: 7 – Cashmere Technical (2021)
 Most points in a season: 49 – Cashmere Technical and Christchurch United (2022)
 Fewest points in a season: 4 – Nelson Suburbs, Green Island (both 2021)
 Highest goal difference: +62 – Christchurch United (2022)
 Biggest home win: – Cashmere Technical 11–2 Mosgiel (7 May 2022)
 Biggest away win: – Nomads United 0–8 Christchurch United (23 April 2022) and Mosgiel 0–8 Cashmere Technical (7 May 2022)
 Highest scoring match: 13 goals – Cashmere Technical 11–2 Mosgiel (7 May 2022)
 Biggest title-winning margin: – 5 points, 2021, Cashmere Technical (18 points) over Selwyn United (13 points)
 Smallest title-winning margin: – 0 points and +3 goal difference, 2022, Christchurch United (+62) over Cashmere Technical (+59). Both finished on 49 points.

MVP Winners

Past Champions

2021 – Cashmere Technical
2022 – Christchurch United

References

External links
 National League official website
 FootballSouth official website
 Mainland official website

2
Sports leagues established in 2021
2021 establishments in New Zealand